Sri Venkateswara College of Engineering and Technology (SVCET) is an engineering college located in Thiruppachur, Tiruvallur, a district adjacent to Chennai city (formerly Madras), in Southern India.

Organization

Administration

The college was established in 1999 with AICTE approval and started functioning in 2000.  Sri Venkateswara Educational and Cultural Trust was formed to provide educational opportunities to students in and around

SVCET is Accredited by the National Board of Accreditation (NBA) in India.

Departments
 Computer Science and technology
 Civil Engineering
 Mechanical Engineering
 Electrical and Electronics Engineering
 Electronics and Communication Engineering
 Computer Science and Engineering
 Master of Computer Application
 Master of Business Administration

Campus

The college offers education in various branches of engineering. It has laboratories for:

 Chemistry
 Physics
 Electrical Machinery and Microprocessor
 Electronic Circuits, Linear Integrated Circuits, Electron Devices and Telecommunication
 Workshops
 Civil
 Drawing Hall

Academics

The courses of study are organized on semester programs with each semester providing for a minimum of seventy instructional days. The language of instruction is English. Students are evaluated on a continuous basis throughout the semester.

There are presently five associations in the College to broaden the spectrum of knowledge of the student and provide an insight into the practical application of theoretical aspects taught in the class.

 Information Technology Association.
 Computer Science And Engineering Association.
 Electrical And Electronics Engineering Association.
 Electronics And Communication Engineering Association.
 Civil Engineering Association.
 Mechanical Engineering Association.

The Department of Civil Engineering is Ranked No.1 with 95.3% among the Engineering colleges affiliated to Anna University, Chennai.

A Fine Arts Club at the college aims at developing the student's talents in music, drama, drawing, writing, and elocution.

Eligible students can avail scholarship facilities offered by both the Government of India and the Government of Tamil Nadu. Besides these, the college management may also offer financial support in deserving cases.

Career counseling and guidance 

The college conducts regular counseling sessions for students to improve their studies and score better in the university and competitive examinations. The college also gives guidance to pursue post-graduate studies. Each student is attached to a faculty member who acts as the student's counselor for guiding and directing him in academic and personal development to attain academic excellence with professional competence and sound character.

One of the best colleges in Tiruvellore district.
Giving importance to students scoring good marks in their 12th standard.
No tuition fees for first coming five students in all departments who scoring 90% and above. This is first-come, first-served basis.

Extracurricular activities

The college holds many inter college cultural, technical and sports meets. The most successful inter college event has been eQuest, which is organized by the department of IT and CSE and Evoluzione, which is organized by department of Electrical and Electronics Engineering .

References

External links
 Official website 	
 Student's website
 Evoluzione official Website

Engineering colleges in Tamil Nadu
Colleges affiliated to Anna University
Education in Tiruvallur district
Educational institutions established in 2000
2000 establishments in Tamil Nadu